Babelomurex nagahorii is a species of sea snail, a marine gastropod mollusc in the family Muricidae, the murex snails or rock snails.  It is found on Balicasag Island in the Philippines.

Description

Distribution

References

nagahorii
Gastropods described in 1980